Hermas was a well-to-do freedman and earnest Christian, who lived in Ancient Rome. He was a brother of Pius, Bishop of Rome about the middle of the 2nd century. Hermas the freedman was the character and, by some estimations, the author of the work titled The Shepherd of Hermas, which, in the early Church, was sometimes classed among the canonical "Scriptures".

Relationship to Pius I
There are three sources indicating Hermas was the brother of Pius I: 
  
 (a) the Muratorian fragment,: "Pastorem vero nuperrime temporibus nostris in urbe Roma Herma conscripsit, sedente cathedra urbis Romae ecclesiae Pio episcopo fratre ejus. Et ideo legi eum quidem oportet, se publicare vero in ecclesia populo neque inter prophetas completos numero, neque inter apostolos in fine temporum, potest" - "And very recently, in our own times, in the city of Rome, Herma wrote the Pastor, when his brother Pius, the bishop, sat upon the chair of the Church of the city of Rome. And therefore that (book) ought to be perused, but it cannot be publicly read to the people assembled in church, neither among the Prophets, whose number is complete, nor among the Apostles (who came) in the end of times."
 (b) the Liberian catalogue of popes, in a portion which dates from 235 (Hippolytus?): "Sub hujus (Pii) episcopatu frater ejus Ermes librum scripsit, in quo mandatum continetur quae (quod) praecepit ei angelus, cum venit ad illum in habitu Pastoris" - "Under his (Pius') episcopate, his brother Ermes wrote a book in which are contained the precepts which the angel delivered to him, coming to him in the guise of a Shepherd."
 (c) the poem of Pseudo-Tertullian against Marcion, of the 3rd or 4th century: "Post hunc deinde Pius, Hermas cui germine frater angelicus Pastor, quia tradita verba locutus." - "Then, after him, Pius, whose brother according to the flesh was Hermas, the angelic shepherd, because he spoke the words given to him."

The statement that Hermas wrote during his brother's Pius pontificate may similarly be an inference from the fact that it was in a list of popes, against the name of Pius, that the writer found the information that Hermas was that pope's brother. He may have been an elder brother of the pope.

The Shepherd
The Shepherd has been viewed as an allegory, similar to Pilgrim's Progress. Apparent autobiographical points "...may be fact, or pure fiction, or fiction founded upon fact." It is not even certain that the writer's name was really Hermas.

Butler's account

The hagiographer Alban Butler (1710–1773) wrote in his Lives of the Fathers, Martyrs, and Other Principal Saints under May 9,

References

Sources

External links
 

Year of birth missing
Year of death missing
2nd-century Christian mystics
2nd-century Christians
2nd-century Romans
2nd-century writers
Angelic visionaries
Christian slaves and freedmen
Christian writers
Imperial Roman slaves and freedmen
Ancient Roman Christian mystics
Roman Catholic mystics